This is a list of Spanish Academy Award winners and nominees. This list details the performances of filmmakers, actors, actresses and films that have either been submitted, nominated or have won an Academy Award. The people included are either from Spain or of Spanish descent.

Acting categories

Actor in a Leading Role

Actor in a Supporting Role

Actress in a Leading Role

Actress in a Supporting Role

Animated Feature

Cinematography

Costume Design

Director

Documentary Feature

International Feature Film

This list focuses on Spanish films that won or were nominated for the Best International Feature Film.

Makeup & Hairstyling

Music categories

Original Score

Production Design

Short-film categories

Animated Short Film

Note: At the 2013 Academy Awards edition, the Spanish-Luxembourgish director Alexandre Espigares won the Oscar for best animated short film for Mr. Hublot (co-directed with Laurent Witz).

Live Action Short Film

Visual Effects

Writing categories

Original Screenplay

Adapted Screenplay

Nominations and Winners

See also

 Cinema of Spain
 List of Spanish films

References

Lists of Academy Award winners and nominees by nationality or region
Academy Award winners and nominees
Cinema of Spain